Malé Leváre is a village and municipality in western Slovakia in Malacky District in the Bratislava region, near the border with Austria.

It was mentioned for the first time in deed from the year 1377, issued by the king Louis I. of Hungary. Village is dominated by renaissance, baroque rebuilt Roman Catholic church of Assumption of the Holy Virgin. In the area of the village there is also a baroque chapel, and bunkers, which were built as part of Czechoslovak border fortification in 1938. During socialism, Iron Curtain was leading near the village and the border was guarded by soldiers.

External links

Villages and municipalities in Malacky District